Willian Lanes de Lima (born 10 February 1985 in Ribeirão Preto), simply Lima, is a Brazilian footballer who plays as a central defender.

Football career
Lima was signed by Real Betis from Clube Atlético Mineiro on the dying days of the 2007 summer transfer window, after some problems obtaining an Italian passport in order to qualify for European Union citizenship, which were resolved on August 29. His official unveiling by the club was postponed as a mark of respect following the death of Antonio Puerta, who played for local rivals Sevilla FC.

During his stay, Lima struggled mightily with first team opportunities, making his La Liga debut on 31 October 2007, in a 0–3 home loss against CA Osasuna. His second season consisted of 36 minutes against FC Barcelona: after having replaced captain Juanito, he also had to be stretchered off, in a 2–2 home draw; eventually, the Andalusians were relegated.

In 2010, after failing his medical at Clube de Regatas do Flamengo, where he was supposed to move on loan, Lima signed with former side Atlético Mineiro.

Honours
Atlético Mineiro
Série B: 2006
Campeonato Mineiro: 2007, 2010

Portuguesa
Campeonato Paulista Série A2: 2013

América Mineiro
Campeonato Brasileiro Série B: 2017

References

External links

1985 births
Living people
People from Ribeirão Preto
Brazilian footballers
Association football defenders
Campeonato Brasileiro Série A players
Campeonato Brasileiro Série B players
Campeonato Brasileiro Série C players
Clube Atlético Mineiro players
Associação Portuguesa de Desportos players
Botafogo Futebol Clube (SP) players
Fortaleza Esporte Clube players
Ituano FC players
América Futebol Clube (MG) players
La Liga players
Real Betis players
Brazilian expatriate footballers
Brazilian expatriate sportspeople in Spain
Expatriate footballers in Spain
Footballers from São Paulo (state)